Tony Dean Smith (born 12 October 1977) is a screenwriter director and editor for film and television.

Smith was born in Johannesburg, South Africa. He currently lives in Vancouver, British Columbia.

An award-winning graduate of the Vancouver Film School, he was selected to be one of five directors for the Directors Guild of Canada 'KickStart' 2003 program, resulting in Best Short Film Leo Award for his film, Reflection, 2004.

Smith has directed numerous episodes for the television series Robson Arms, written and directed the Whistler Webisodes and co-directed the comedy Summerhood (written and directed by Jacob Medjuck).

He is the director and co-writer of the science-fiction feature film Volition.

As a picture editor for film, TV and music videos, Smith's editing has received awards, nominations and numerous festival entries.

Filmography 

 The Other Side of Being, 2000
 Reflection, 2004
 Summerhood, 2008 (Co-Director)
 The Killer Downstairs, 2019 (TV Movie)
 Love Under the Rainbow, 2019 (TV Movie)
 Volition, 2019

References

External links
 

1977 births
Living people
South African screenwriters
People from Johannesburg
South African emigrants to Canada
South African film directors
Canadian male screenwriters
Film directors from Vancouver
Writers from Vancouver